AKM Aszad was a Bangladesh Jamaat-e-Islami politician from Rajbari District and former Member of Parliament from Rajbari-2 constituency.

Early life 
Aszad was born in Rajbari District.

Career 
Aszad was elected as a Member of Parliament from Rajbari-2 constituency as a candidate of Bangladesh Jamaat-e-Islami in the fifth parliamentary elections of 1991. He has died.

References 

5th Jatiya Sangsad members
Bangladesh Jamaat-e-Islami politicians
Year of birth missing
1996 deaths
People from Rajbari District